Fled Bricrenn (Old Irish "Bricriu's Feast") is a story from the Ulster Cycle of Irish mythology. Bricriu, an inveterate troublemaker, invites the nobles of the Ulaid to a feast at his new bruiden (hostel, banquet hall) at Dún Rudraige (Dundrum, County Down), where he incites three heroes, Cúchulainn, Conall Cernach, and Lóegaire Búadach, to compete for the "champion's portion" of the feast. The three heroes perform several feats, and travel to Connacht to be judged by Ailill and Medb, and to Munster to be judged by Cú Roí, and on each occasion Cúchulainn is proclaimed champion, but the other two refuse to accept it. Eventually, back at Emain Macha, the three heroes are each challenged by a giant churl to cut off his head, on the condition that they allow him to cut off their heads in return. First Lóegaire, then Conall, takes up the challenge and cuts off the churl's head, only for him to pick it up and leave, but when the churl returns the following night they are nowhere to be seen. Only Cúchulainn lives up to his side of the bargain. The churl spares his life, reveals himself to be Cú Roí in disguise, and announces that Cúchulainn's bravery and honour make him undisputed champion.

The story dates from the 8th century and is found in several manuscripts, including the Lebor na hUidre (c. 1106). The motif of warriors competing for the champion's portion is found in another Ulster Cycle tale, Scéla Mucce Maic Dathó ("The Tale of Mac Dathó's Pig"), and is reminiscent of descriptions of customs of the Celts of continental Europe as recorded by classical authors. The beheading challenge also has classical parallels, and also appears in later medieval literary works like Sir Gawain and the Green Knight.

Fled Bricrenn is not to be confused with Fled Bricrenn ocus Loinges mac nDuíl Dermait ("Bricriu's Feast, and the Exile of the sons of Dóel Dermait"), another Ulster Cycle tale which features Bricriu and a prestigious portion of food (airigid).

Manuscript sources
Ed. XL: p. 69–76 (Edinburgh, National Library of Scotland). 'Cennach ind Ruanada' only.
Egerton 93: f. 20R-25V (London, British Library). Fragment.
MS 1336 (H 3.17): p. 683–710 (Dublin, Trinity College Library). Fragment.
MS 1337 (H 3.18): p. 607 (Dublin, Trinity College Library). Glossed extracts.
Codex Vossianus: f 3R-9V (Leiden). Fragments. CELT
MS 23 E 25 or Lebor na hUidre (LU): p. 99b–112b +H (Dublin, RIA). End missing. Contains interpolations by H.

References

Further reading

Editions and translations 
Meyer, Kuno (ed. and tr.). "The Edinburgh version of the Cennach ind Rúanado (The bargain of the strong man).” Revue Celtique 14 (1893): 450–91. Based on Ed. XL.
Henderson, George (ed. and tr.). Fled Bricrend. Irish Texts Society 2. London and Dublin, 1899. Based on LU 99b1-112b48, Ed. XL and variants. Available online here. Audiobook at Internet Archive.
Best, R.I. and Osborn Bergin (eds.), Lebor na hUidre. Book of the Dun Cow. Dublin, 1929. 50–3. Diplomatic edition of the Lebor na hUidre. Available from CELT
Henderson, George (tr.), "Bricriu's Feast". In Ancient Irish tales, ed. T.P. Cross and C.H. Slover. New York, 1936. 254–80.
Gantz, Jeffrey (tr.). Early Irish Myths and Sagas. New York, 1981. 219–55. Based on the Leiden and Edinburgh versions.
Koch, John T. and Henderson, George (trs.). In The Celtic Heroic Age, ed. John T. Koch and John Carey. 3d ed. Andover, 2000. 76–105. Updated version of Henderson's translation.

Secondary literature 
Martin, B.K. "The Medieval Irish Stories about Bricriu's Feast and Mac Dátho's Pig". Parergon: Bulletin of the Australian and New Zealand Association for Medieval and Renaissance Studies 10.1 (1992): 71–93.
Ó Riain, Padraig (ed). Fled Bricrenn: Reassessments. London, 2000. Contains the following essays: Maier, Bernhard, "Comparing Fled Bricrenn with Classical Descriptions of Continental Celts: Parallels, Problems and Pitfalls" (1–14); Koch, John T., "Fled Bricrenn'''s Significance within the Broader Celtic Context" (15–39); Jacobs, Nicolas, "Fled Bricrenn and Sir Gawain and the Green Knight" (40–55); Hellmuth, Petra S., "The Role of Cu Roi in Fled Bricrenn" (56–69); Mac Cana, Proinsias, "Notes on Structure and Syntax in Fled Bricrenn''" (70–92).

Early Irish literature
Irish texts
Irish-language literature
Medieval literature
Narratives of the Ulster Cycle